Mynderse Academy is a high school located in Seneca Falls, New York, United States that teaches according to the Board of Regents. It is located adjacent to Seneca Falls Middle School.

History 
Mynderse Academy was previously located at 12 North Park Street in Seneca Falls. Due to crowding issues, the school moved to its current location on Troy Street.  The Park Street building, known as "Academy Square", currently houses offices for several businesses and service groups. On December 19, 2017, a Capital Project referendum was held, resulting in a vote of 178-31 in favor of the proposition. The major reconstruction will include a new bus garage and parking areas, renovated locker rooms, gymnasium, and science classrooms. The project will begin in 2019.

Notable alumni 
 William J. Maier (1876-1941), New York Assemblyman
Harold C. Mitchell (1872–1938), New York Assemblyman
 Michael Nozzolio (born 1951), New York State Senator
 Kelly Connell (born 1956), Actor

Notable teachers 
 J. Stanley Marshall (1923-2014), Physics Teacher, President of Florida State University

References

External links
 School website

Public high schools in New York (state)
Schools in Seneca County, New York
Seneca Falls, New York